Roberto Zulian Junior (born April 4, 1994, in Vacaria), commonly known as Vacaria, is a Brazilian footballer who plays for Pelotas.

Honours

Remo
Campeonato Paraense: 2019

External links
 Vacaria at playmakerstats.com (English version of ogol.com.br)
 

1994 births
Living people
Brazilian footballers
Brazilian expatriate footballers
Esporte Clube Juventude players
Fortaleza Esporte Clube players
Grêmio Esportivo Brasil players
Clube do Remo players
Esporte Clube Pelotas players
Association football midfielders